"Let's Go Out" is the debut single by Japanese pop duo Amoyamo. It was released October 31, 2012. The single peaked at number 23 on the Oricon singles chart and charted for five weeks. "Let's Go Out" was used as the twelfth opening song for Gintama. The single included a cover of "Pray" by Tommy heavenly6, which was the original Gintama opening.

Track listing

References

2012 singles
Songs written by Tomoko Kawase
2012 songs
Defstar Records singles